JRCLS may refer to:

 J. Reuben Clark Law School
 J. Reuben Clark Law Society